Lens fiber membrane intrinsic protein is a protein that in humans is encoded by the LIM2 gene.

The mammalian lens fiber cell membrane contains 5 major proteins ranging from 70 kD to 19 kD in size. The specific function of these proteins is unknown. Some of them have been shown to be involved in the formation of cataracts, e.g., crystalline-gamma-1 (CRYG1; MIM 123660). The second most abundant intrinsic membrane protein of the lens fiber cell is MP19, so named for major lens protein having a molecular weight of 19.5 kD.

This protein appears to contain 4 transmembrane domains, is a substrate for cAMP-dependent protein kinase and protein kinase C, and binds with calmodulin. Taken together, these suggest that MP19 functions in some way as a junctional component, possibly involved with lens cell communication. It has been shown to be involved with cataractogenesis.[supplied by OMIM]

References

Further reading